Mwera is a Bantu language of Tanzania.

References

Rufiji-Ruvuma languages
Languages of Tanzania